Dubois is a city in Clark County, Idaho, United States.  The population was 511 at the 2020 census.  The city is the county seat of Clark County.

The city was named in 1892 for Fred Dubois (1851−1930), a prominent politician in Idaho's early years. He came to Idaho in 1880, later becoming the state's first U.S. Senator, serving two non-consecutive terms (1891−97, 1901−07).

Six miles (10 km) north of town is the U.S. Sheep Experiment Station, the county's second largest employer. The station studies sheep breeds to support U.S. farmers. Dubois is near the Caribou-Targhee National Forest, which calls one of its administrative units the Dubois ranger district.

Geography

Demographics

2010 census
As of the census of 2010, there were 677 people, 229 households, and 167 families residing in the city. The racial makeup of the city was 67.1% White, 0.9% African American, 0.7% Native American, 0.3% Asian, 30.4% from other races, and 0.6% from two or more races. Hispanic or Latino of any race were 49.6% of the population.

There were 229 households, of which 41.9% had children under the age of 18 living with them, 58.1% were married couples living together, 9.2% had a female householder with no husband present, 5.7% had a male householder with no wife present, and 27.1% were non-families. 21.4% of all households were made up of individuals, and 10.5% had someone living alone who was 65 years of age or older. The average household size was 2.96 and the average family size was 3.46.

The median age in the city was 32.3 years. 32.6% of residents were under the age of 18; 8.4% were between the ages of 18 and 24; 24.6% were from 25 to 44; 22.5% were from 45 to 64; and 11.8% were 65 years of age or older. The gender makeup of the city was 51.6% male and 48.4% female.

2000 census
As of the census of 2000, there were 647 people, 214 households, and 164 families residing in the city. The racial makeup of the city was 70.02% White, 1.08% Native American, 0.15% Asian, 0.15% Pacific Islander, 27.51% from other races, and 1.08% from two or more races. Hispanic or Latino of any race were 39.57% of the population.

There were 214 households, out of which 49.1% had children under the age of 18 living with them, 60.7% were married couples living together, 10.3% had a female householder with no husband present, and 22.9% were non-families. 19.6% of all households were made up of individuals, and 11.2% had someone living alone who was 65 years of age or older.  The average household size was 3.02 and the average family size was 3.52.

In the city, the population was spread out, with 36.0% under the age of 18, 8.0% from 18 to 24, 27.2% from 25 to 44, 18.4% from 45 to 64, and 10.4% who were 65 years of age or older.  The median age was 30 years. For every 100 females, there were 107.4 males.  For every 100 females age 18 and over, there were 98.1 males.

The median income for a household in the city was $29,167, and the median income for a family was $30,417. Males had a median income of $24,444 versus $21,000 for females. The per capita income for the city was $10,389.  About 21.4% of families and 20.9% of the population were below the poverty line, including 25.7% of those under age 18 and 14.1% of those age 65 or over.

Climate
Dubois experiences a humid continental climate (Köppen Dfb) with long, cold winters and hot, wetter summers.

See also
 List of cities in Idaho

References

External links

 
 Clark County School District #161
 U.S. Sheep Experiment Station
 Clark County official site

Cities in Clark County, Idaho
Cities in Idaho
County seats in Idaho